Carlos Longo Esteban (born 5 February 1982 in Huelva, Andalusia) is a badminton player from Spain. He won his first senior title at the National Championships in 2004 partnered with Rafael Fernández. A year later, he played at the 2005 World Badminton Championships in Anaheim, United States. In the men's singles event he lost in the first round 15–8, 15–5, against Hugi Heimersson of Sweden. In the mixed doubles event, partnering Laura Molina, they lost in the first round due to a Laura Molina's injury. He also played the 2006 World Championships in men's singles, and he was defeated in first round by Roman Spitko of Germany. Longo also won the mixed doubles title at the National Championships in 2009 and 2010 with Haideé Ojeda.

Achievements

BWF International Challenge/Series 
Men's singles

Mixed doubles

 BWF International Challenge tournament
 BWF International Series tournament
 BWF Future Series tournament

References

External links 
 

1982 births
Living people
Sportspeople from Huelva
Spanish male badminton players